Winter Park Resort is an alpine ski resort in the western United States, in the Rocky Mountains of Colorado at Winter Park. Located in Grand County just off U.S. Highway 40, the resort is about a ninety-minute drive from Denver.

History
The mountain opened for the 1939–40 season as Winter Park Ski Area and was owned and operated by the city and county of Denver until 2002, when Denver entered into a partnership with Intrawest ULC, a Canadian corporation headquartered in Vancouver, British Columbia, which operated the resort until Intrawest was acquired by Alterra Mountain Company in 2018. For nearly 70 years, a popular way for Denver residents to arrive was via the Ski Train, which arrived at the resort's base area through the Moffat Tunnel. Ski Train service ended in 2009 but returned as the Winter Park Express in 2017. Winter Park Resort is home to one of the world's largest and oldest disabled skiing programs, the National Sports Center for the Disabled.

During Intrawest's stint operating the resort, they made several changes to the mountain's infrastructure, renovating the food services in the West Portal base lodge, opening new lifts in 2005 and 2006, and a new base village with hundreds of condominia, a parking structure, a "Village Pond," retail space, and an open-air gondola known as "The Village Cabriolet." The historic 1955 Balcony House was listed as one of Colorado's Most Endangered Places by Colorado Preservation, Inc. This historic building was designed in the Googie style of architecture, which was a popular style in the 1940s to the 1960s.

The resort consists of three interconnected mountain peaks — Winter Park, Mary Jane, and Vasquez Ridge — which share a common lift ticket. Mary Jane, opened in 1975, has a separate base area and is known for its moguls, tree skiing, hidden huts, and generally more difficult terrain.  It encompasses the above-tree line terrain of Parsenn Bowl. Vasquez Ridge, opened in 1986, offers intermediate terrain and mogul runs. In 1997,  of backcountry terrain in Vasquez Cirque were opened to skiing, although access required hiking from the top of Mary Jane; the 2006 relocation of the former Outrigger triple chairlift to the backside of Parsenn Bowl (now called Eagle Wind) provides an easier escape back to Mary Jane after descending Vasquez Cirque.

Beginning with the 2013-14 season, the resort was divided into seven "territories". The three peaks — Winter Park, Mary Jane, and Vasquez Ridge — are each considered their own territories. Parsenn Bowl is now considered its own territory separate from Mary Jane. The remaining three are Vasquez Cirque (the backcountry terrain behind Parsenn Bowl), Eagle Wind (the glade below Vasquez Cirque), and "Terrain Park" (the various terrain parks across the mountain).

Winter Park is a year-round resort; the resort operates the lifts during the summer months for mountain biking, hiking and sightseeing. The Arrow chairlift also services an alpine slide in the summer, and the base area features miniature golf, a climbing wall, and other diversions. While the Winter Park area is also a popular destination for golf, there are no golf courses located at, or operated by, the resort itself.  Winter Park boasts the most extensive lift access summer mountain biking trails in Colorado.

In 2018 Winter Park Resort was named "Best ski resort in North America" as voted by the readers of USA Today. In 2019 Winter Park Resort was named "Number 1 Ski Resort in North America".

Winter Park hosted the NCAA Skiing Championships in 1956, 1959, 1972, and 1977. The team title went to Denver in 1956 and Colorado took the latter three.

Statistics

Elevation
Base: 
Summit: 
Vertical rise:

Trails
Skiable area: 
Trails: 166 total (8% beginner, 18% intermediate, 19% advanced, 52% difficult, 3% expert)
Average annual snowfall: 
"Territories"
Winter Park
Vasquez Ridge
Parsenn Bowl
Terrain Park
Mary Jane
Eagle Wind
The Cirque

Slope Aspects
North: 50% 
East: 10%
South: 2% 
West: 38%

Lifts
Winter Park currently has 23 operating lifts.

Former lifts
Winter Park Colorado

Historic Trails

During Winter Park's 75-year history, many individuals have made significant contributions to the development and image of the ski area. Several ski trails have been identified on the resort's website as "historical trails," and even more exist on the mountain. A commemorative sign, with a brief narrative about the individual's contribution to the ski area, has been installed along each historical trail. Listed are both the run and in parentheses the lift that reaches them:

Hughes (The Gondola or Explorer Express)
Cranmer (The Gondola or Explorer Express)
Allan Phipps (The Gondola, Explorer Express or Prospector Express)
Bradley's Bash (The Gondola or Explorer Express)
Mulligan's Mile (The Gondola or Explorer Express)
Jack Kendrick (Prospector Express or Looking Glass)
Mt. Maury (learning slope with carpet)
Retta's Run (Explorer Express lift line)
Engeldive (Prospector Express and Looking Glass)
Balch (The Gondola or Explorer Express)
Wilson's Way (Discovery learning double)
Mary Jane Trail (reached from Super Gauge Express, Olympia Express or High Lonesome Express)
Over N' Underwood (Prospector Express or Looking Glass) (not listed on website)
Butch's Breezeway (Prospector Express or Looking Glass) (not listed on website)

Notable people
Elizabeth McIntyre (born 1965), freestyle skier, Olympic silver medalist; lives in Winter Park
Ryan Max Riley (born 1979), freestyle skier, US Champion, and humorist; lived in Winter Park
Ryan St. Onge (born 1983), freestyle skier, World Champion and two-time Olympian; lived in Winter Park
Michelle Roark (born 1974), freestyle skier, World Champion silver medalist and two-time Olympian; lived in Winter Park

See also
Winter Park Express
Ski Idlewild

References

External links

Official Web Site
ColoradoSkiHistory.com's Winter Park page
List of Ski Lifts at Winter Park
3dSkiMap of Winter Park Resort
Database of ski maps of Winter Park

Alterra Mountain Company
Ski areas and resorts in Colorado
Buildings and structures in Grand County, Colorado
Tourist attractions in Grand County, Colorado